There has been six baronetcies created for persons with the surname Shaw, one in the Baronetage of England, one in the Baronetage of Nova Scotia and four in the Baronetage of the United Kingdom. Two of the creations extant as of 2010.

The Shaw, later Best-Shaw Baronetcy, of Eltham in the County of Kent, was created in the Baronetage of England on 15 April 1665. For more information on this creation, see Best-Shaw baronets.

The Shaw or Schaw Baronetcy, of Greenock in the County of Renfrew, was created in the Baronetage of Nova Scotia on 28 June 1687 for John Shaw. The third Baronet sat as Member of Parliament for Renfrewshire and Clackmannanshire. The title became extinct on his death in 1752, when his estates went to his relative Sir John Stewart, who adopted the additional surname Shaw. His succession continued as the Shaw Stewart baronets of Greenock and Blackhall.

The Shaw Baronetcy, of Kilmarnock in the County of Ayr, was created in the Baronetage of the United Kingdom on 21 September 1809 for James Shaw, Lord Mayor of London in 1805 and Member of Parliament for the City of London, with normal remainder to the heirs male of his body. He obtained a new patent on 14 January 1813 with remainder to his nephew, John Shaw. On Shaw's death in 1843 the 1809 creation became extinct while he was succeeded in the 1813 creation according to the special remainder by his nephew, the second Baronet. However, on the latter's death in 1868 this creation became extinct as well.

The Shaw Baronetcy, of Bushy Park in the County of Dublin, was created in the Baronetage of the United Kingdom on 17 August 1821 for the Tory politician Robert Shaw. The third Baronet was also a politician. George Shaw, second son of the third Baronet, was a Major-General in the British Army. The celebrated playwright George Bernard Shaw belonged to this family.

The Shaw Baronetcy, of Wolverhampton in the County of Stafford, was created in the Baronetage of the United Kingdom on 30 November 1908 for Charles Shaw, Member of Parliament for Stafford. The title became extinct on his death in 1942.

Shaw, later Best-Shaw baronets, of Eltham (1665)

see Best-Shaw baronets

Shaw baronets, of Greenock (1687)
Sir John Shaw, 1st Baronet (died 1693)
Sir John Shaw, 2nd Baronet (died 1702)
Sir John Shaw, 3rd Baronet (–1752)

Shaw baronets, of Kilmarnock (1809) 
Sir James Shaw, 1st Baronet (1764–1843)

Shaw baronets, of Kilmarnock (1813) 
Sir James Shaw, 1st Baronet (1764–1843)
Sir John Shaw, 2nd Baronet (–1868)

Shaw baronets, of Bushy Park (1821) 

Sir Robert Shaw, 1st Baronet (1774–1849)
Sir Robert Shaw, 2nd Baronet (1796–1869)
Sir Frederick Shaw, 3rd Baronet (1799–1876)
Sir Robert Shaw, 4th Baronet (1821–1895)
Sir Frederick William Shaw, DSO, 5th Baronet (1858–1927)
Sir Robert de Vere Shaw, MC and Bar, 6th Baronet (1890–1969)
Sir Robert Shaw, 7th Baronet (1925–2002)
Sir Charles de Vere Shaw, 8th Baronet (born 1957)

The heir apparent to the baronetcy is Robert Jonathan De Vere Shaw (born 1988), only son of the 8th Baronet.

Shaw baronets, of Wolverhampton (1908) 

Sir (Theodore Frederick) Charles Edward Shaw, 1st Baronet (1859–1942)

See also
Shaw-Stewart baronets
Best-Shaw baronets

Notes

References 
Kidd, Charles, Williamson, David (editors). Debrett's Peerage and Baronetage (1990 edition). New York: St Martin's Press, 1990, 

Baronetcies in the Baronetage of England
Baronetcies in the Baronetage of the United Kingdom
Extinct baronetcies in the Baronetage of Nova Scotia
Extinct baronetcies in the Baronetage of the United Kingdom
Baronetcies created with special remainders